Rubus pittieri is an uncommon Central American species of brambles in the rose family. It has been found only in Costa Rica.

Rubus pittieri is a perennial with curved prickles. Leaves are compound with 3 or 5 leaflets. Flowers are white. Fruits are purple.

References

pittieri
Flora of Costa Rica
Plants described in 1913